Shona Laing (born 9 October 1955) is a New Zealand musician.  She has had several hits in her native country, as well as a few minor international hits, most notably "(Glad I'm) Not a Kennedy" and "Soviet Snow".  Laing contributed to Manfred Mann's Earth Band album Somewhere in Afrika and contributed music to, and appeared in, the 1985 action film Shaker Run.

Musical career
Laing first came to prominence in 1972 as a 17-year-old schoolgirl, coming runner-up in the television talent show New Faces with her song "1905". Signed to a recording contract with Phonogram, her first two singles, "1905" and "Show Your Love" both certified gold and both peaked at number 4 on the New Zealand charts. In 1973, she won two Rata awards: Best New Artist and Recording Artist Of The Year. Laing twice represented New Zealand at the Tokyo Music Festival, in 1973 (with the song "Masquerade") and 1974. In 1975, she relocated to Britain and was based there for the next seven years during which time she released a number of singles and an album, Tied to the Tracks in 1981. She joined Manfred Mann's Earth Band for two years, working alongside English musician Chris Thompson for the album Somewhere in Afrika.

Laing returned to New Zealand in 1983, and released her album Genre two years later, in 1985. The song "(Glad I'm) Not a Kennedy" eventually charted in Australia, and was re-released as part of her next album, South. The song reached No. 2 on the NZ Singles Chart in August 1987. Laing won the APRA Silver Scroll in 1988 for "Soviet Snow" and in 1992 for "Mercy of Love". 

Laing was inducted into the New Zealand Music Hall of Fame as the Legacy Award recipient at the 2013 New Zealand Music Awards in November 2013.

Personal life
During a concert on 18 July 1996, Shona Laing said she was bisexual and in a relationship with another woman.

Discography

Albums

Compilation albums

Singles

Awards

New Zealand Music Awards 

|-
| 1973
| Shona Laing
| Recording Artist of the Year
|  
|-
| 1973
| Shona Laing
| Best New Artist
| 
|-
| 1985
| Shona Laing – Genre
| Album of the Year
|  
|-
| 1987
| "Glad I'm Not a Kennedy" – Shona Laing
| Single of the Year
|  
|-
| 1987
| Shona Laing
| Best Female Vocalist
| 
|-
| 1987
| Shona Laing
| International Achievement
| 
|-
| 1987
| Kerry Brown and Bruce Sheridan – "Glad I'm Not a Kennedy" (Shona Laing)
| Best Video
| 
|-
| 1987
| Shona Laing
| Best Songwriter
| 
|-
| 1988
| Shona Laing – South
| Album of the Year
|  
|-
| 1988
| Shona Laing
| Best Female Vocalist
| 
|-
| 1988
| Shona Laing
| International Achievement
| 
|-
| 1988
| Stephen McCurdy, Shona Laing and Graeme Myhre – "South"
| Best Producer
| 
|-
| 1994
| Shona Laing
| Best Female Vocalist
|  
|-
| 1995
| Shona Laing – Shona
| Album of the Year
|  
|-
| 2013
| Shona Laing
| New Zealand Music Hall of Fame
| 
|}

References

External links
Shona Laing Biography

1955 births
Living people
APRA Award winners
Bisexual singers
Bisexual songwriters
Bisexual women
Women new wave singers
New Zealand women singer-songwriters
21st-century New Zealand women singers
20th-century New Zealand women singers
New Zealand new wave musicians
New Zealand women pop singers
New Zealand LGBT songwriters
Manfred Mann's Earth Band members
New Zealand LGBT singers
New Zealand women in electronic music
20th-century New Zealand LGBT people
21st-century New Zealand LGBT people
Vertigo Records artists
Philips Records artists
EMI Records artists
Virgin Records artists
TVT Records artists
Columbia Records artists
Epic Records artists